Błażej Janiaczyk (born 27 January 1983) is a Polish former racing cyclist, who professionally between 2005 and 2016 for the , , , , ,  and  teams. He rode at the 2014 UCI Road World Championships.

Major results

2004
 1st La Roue Tourangelle
 1st Coppa della Pace
 3rd Trofeo Banca Popolare di Vicenza
 4th GP Kranj
 7th Road race, UEC European Under-23 Road Championships
 7th Giro del Belvedere
2005
 3rd Time trial, National Under-23 Road Championships
2006
 7th Giro del Piemonte
2007
 2nd Overall Course de la Solidarité Olympique
1st Points classification
 5th Overall Bałtyk–Karkonosze Tour
 10th Neuseen Classics
2008
 2nd Memoriał Henryka Łasaka
 3rd Overall Course de la Solidarité Olympique
 3rd Overall Tour of Hainan
 6th Overall Szlakiem Walk Majora Hubala
2009
 3rd Road race, National Road Championships
 5th Memoriał Andrzeja Trochanowskiego
 9th Overall Tour of Hainan
2010
 4th Pomerania Tour
 5th Overall Tour of Małopolska
 10th Overall Szlakiem Grodów Piastowskich
2012
 8th Puchar Ministra Obrony Narodowej
 9th Overall Szlakiem Grodów Piastowskich
 9th Overall Course de la Solidarité Olympique
 9th Overall Okolo Jižních Čech
 9th Poreč Trophy
 9th Memoriał Andrzeja Trochanowskiego
2013
 7th Overall Dookoła Mazowsza
2014
 1st Overall Memorial Grundmanna I Wizowskiego
 2nd Race Horizon Park 1
 2nd Race Horizon Park 3
 4th Memoriał Henryka Łasaka
 6th Overall Tour of Małopolska
 8th Croatia–Slovenia
2015
 3rd Visegrad 4 Bicycle Race – GP Hungary
 4th Overall Tour of Estonia
2016
 3rd Visegrad 4 Bicycle Race – GP Slovakia
 3rd Memoriał Andrzeja Trochanowskiego
 6th Horizon Park Classic

References

External links

1983 births
Living people
Polish male cyclists
Sportspeople from Toruń
20th-century Polish people
21st-century Polish people